The Treaty of New York (1796) was a treaty signed on May 31, 1796, after negotiations in the City of New York between the United States and the Seven Nations of Canada. Under it, the Native Americans in question gave up, for compensation, all claim to land in New York State. There were three signed copies: for New York State, the United States, and the indigenous peoples. In the New York State Archives are receipts from the Seven Nations for money paid under the treaty.

References

External links
 Text of the Treaty

History of New York (state)
1796 in New York (state)
British North America
18th-century Native Americans
Canada–United States treaties
Indigenous peoples in Canada
1796 in Canada